Tirschenreuth (Northern Bavarian: Dirschnrad, Diascharad) is the capital city of the district of Tirschenreuth. It is located in the northeast of Bavaria, very close to the Czech-Bavarian border.

Geography
Tirschenreuth is located in the north of Upper Palatinate administrative region, around 75 miles north of Regensburg and 35 miles east of Bayreuth.

Incorporations
The following villages were incorporated in Tirschenreuth
 Großklenau
 Kleinklenau
 Brunn
 Gründlbach
 Haid
 Höfen
 Hohenwald
 Kleinkonreuth
 Lengenfeld
 Lohnsitz
 Marchaney
 Matzersreuth
 Mooslohe
 Pilmersreuth a. d. Straße
 Pilmersreuth a. Wald
 Rosall
 Rothenbürg
 Sägmühle
 Wondreb
 Wondrebhammer
 Zeidlweid
 Ziegelhütte

History
Until the German Mediatisation in 1803, Tirschenreuth was part of the possessions of the Cistercian Abbey Waldsassen.
It received its town charter from Waldsassen's abbot Johann V. in 1364.
Originally the Waldsassen Abbey and its possessions were immediately subordinate to the Holy Roman Empire. After this state was ended  in the 16th century, Tirschenreuth first became part of the Electorate of the Palatinate, then part of Bavaria. It became capital of the district of the same name. In 1972, when the segmenting of bavarian districts was reformed, the district of Tirschenreuth was expanded with the former district of Kemnath.

Economy
One well-known company that resides in Tirschenreuth is Hamm AG, a manufacturer of road rollers.

Tirschenreuth was famous for fine quality porcelain and vintage pieces are highly sought after by collectors, but its porcelain factory shut down years ago.

International relations

Tirschenreuth is twinned with:
 La Ville-du-Bois, France (2001)
 Planá, Czech Republic (2008)
 Lauf an der Pegnitz, Germany (2011)
 Santa Fe Springs, California, United States

Notable residents
 Arnold Kriegstein, German, was born there in 1949
 Johann Andreas Schmeller, Germanist, was born there in 1785

References

Tirschenreuth (district)